Vijay Kumar Mishra is an Indian politician from the state of Bihar. Recently Janta Dal United has nominated him as a Member of the Legislative Council (MLC).

Vijay Kumar Mishra is the eldest son of a former Railway Minister of India, Lalit Narayan Mishra, and the nephew of the former Union Cabinet minister and ex-Chief Minister of Bihar, Jagannath Mishra.

Mishra has represented Jale assembly constituency in Bihar as a member of the Bihar Legislative Assembly, being first elected for a five-year term in 1990, then again in 2000 and for the years 2010-2014. He also represented Darbhanga as a Member of Parliament in the 8th Lok Sabha (1984–1989) after defeating Pandit Harinath Mishra, a former  Union Minister and Speaker of the Bihar Legislative Assembly. Member of legislative council, MLC during 1975–1980.

Mishra has been a Vice President of the Bharatiya Janata Party, and chairman of the government machinery committee in  the Bihar Legislative Assembly.

He is married to Meena Mishra and has three sons and a daughter. His second son, Rishi Mishra, has also been a Member of the Legislative Assembly for the Jale constituency.

References and sources

Members of Legislative Assembly in Bihar 
Times of India
Times of India

Living people
Members of the Bihar Legislative Council
India MPs 1984–1989
Lok Sabha members from Bihar
Bihar MLAs 1990–1995
Bihar MLAs 2000–2005
Bihar MLAs 2010–2015
Janata Dal (United) politicians
Bharatiya Janata Party politicians from Bihar
Lok Dal politicians
Year of birth missing (living people)